Gabacho (feminine, gabacha) is a word used in the Spanish language to describe foreigners of different origins in previous history. Its origin is in Peninsular Spain, as a derogatory synonym of "French".

In Spain the term keeps the initial meaning, and it is used as a pejorative reference to someone or something specifically French, with no application to any other nationality. Other Spanish speaking countries, however, have adopted the term in a broader sense, acquiring a meaning similar to the meaning guiri has in Spain.

In Spanish speaking countries other than Spain, it can also mean place (specifically the U.S.A.) when the definite article el is used in front of it "el gabacho".
In Spain it has been used as a debasing reference for French people for hundreds of years. In Mexico, Guatemala and El Salvador it is used a deprecatory reference for United States citizens. In Mexico, el gabacho can also mean the United States, as in the place ("Voy para el gabacho", "I'm going to the US").
Gabacha is also a word used in Guatemala for apron. In Central America, it is used to refer to certain types of coats, such as that of a doctor, a kindergarten student, a lab coat or a graduation vest.

Etymology 
The origins are debated. A possible root is the Catalan word gavatx meaning foreigner. Another possible root derives from the Occitan word gavach, meaning "someone who speaks with a faulty speech" or "someone who doesn't speak properly". This is the official position of the Diccionario de la lengua española.

Robert A. Geuljans, etymologist, agrees with the connection between "gabacho" and the Aquitanian and Catalonian origins by considering that the origin of all, gabacho, gavatx and gavach comes from the Occitan word for "goiter", a disorder common in the French Pyrene caused for vitamin deficiency that impairs the ability to speak. Pilgrims afflicted had been traveling from France to Spain since the Middle Ages, to follow the Camino de Santiago hoping for a miraculous cure.

The word may also derive from a mock transcription of the French word for a long coat, specifically for the coats of the French soldiers during the late 18th and early 19th century.

The Etymological Dictionary of the Spanish Language claims the word originated in the 16th century, meaning "rude hillmen", and "he speaks badly the local language". According to the Diccionario de Autoridades in 1734, it is used for the people who originate from the folds of the Pyrenees, because in certain times of the year, they migrated to the Kingdom of Aragon and other parts, where they work in the lowest parts of society.

References

Francophobia in Europe
Spanish slang
Mexican slang
Ethno-cultural designations
Pejorative terms for in-group non-members
Xenophobia
Discrimination in Spain